James Perry may refer to:

 James Perry (journalist) (1756–1821), journalist
 James Franklin Perry (1790–1853), early Texas settler (with wife Emily Austin Perry)
 Jimmy Perry (1923–2016), English actor and scriptwriter
 James E. C. Perry (born 1944), jurist
 James Stewart Perry (born 1947), sculptor
 James L. Perry (born 1948), academic
 James Perry, strongman, see 1992 World's Strongest Man
 James Lewis Perry (born 1979), cyclist
 James M. Perry (1927–2016), American journalist and author
 James M. Perry (lawyer) (1894–1964), South Carolina's first female lawyer
 James Perry (American football), American football coach and player
 James Perry (luthier), Irish luthier 
 Jim Perry (television personality) (1933–2015), television personality and game show host
 Jim Perry (baseball) (born 1935), baseball player
 Jim Perry (politician) (born c. 1972), member of the North Carolina State Senate
 Rick Perry (James Richard Perry, born 1950), American politician
James J Perry (James Jamar Perry), born 1990, Coastal Carolina University

See also
 James De Wolf Perry (1871–1947), bishop
 James Perry House, historic house in Rehoboth, Massachusetts